The Nanlang dialect is a variety of Eastern Min Chinese mostly spoken in Nanlang in Zhongshan in the Pearl River Delta of Guangdong, China. Despite its close proximity, Nanlang is not very closely related to the surrounding dialects in the region, which belong to the Yue group. As such, Nanlang forms a "dialect island" of Min speakers. It is one of three enclaves of Min in Zhongshan, the others being Longdu and Sanxiang.

References 

Guangdong
Southern Min